Zhang Hongbing (born January 1966) is a general (shangjiang) of the People's Liberation Army (PLA). He served as Political Commissar of the 76th Group Army from March 2017 to December 2019. Previously he served as Director of Political Department of the 20th Group Army from 2014 to 2017.

Biography
Zhang was born in Xianning, Hubei. He was Director of Political Department of the 20th Group Army in 2014, and held that office until 2017. In March 2017 he was promoted to become the Political Commissar of the 76th Group Army, a position he held until December 2019.

On December 10, 2019, he was awarded the military rank of lieutenant general (zhongjiang) by Central Military Commission chairman Xi Jinping. In December 2019, he was appointed political commissar of the Eastern Theater Command Ground Force, replacing Liao Keduo. In January 2022, he was appointed Political Commissar of the People's Armed Police and was promoted to the rank of general (shangjiang).

References

People from Xianning
Living people
People's Liberation Army generals from Hubei
1966 births